WDF may refer to:

 Westdeutsches Fernsehen, now WDR Fernsehen, German regional TV
 Windows Driver Frameworks, Microsoft software tools
 World Darts Federation
 Wigner distribution function